San-Martino-di-Lota (French form) or San Martino di Lota (Italian form), is a commune in the French department of Haute-Corse, collectivity and island of Corsica.

Population

See also
Communes of the Haute-Corse department
Tour de Miomo

References

Communes of Haute-Corse